Pascal Lavanchy (born 20 July 1968) is a French former ice dancer. With partner Sophie Moniotte, he is a two-time World medalist (1994 silver, 1995 bronze) and two-time European medalist (1995 silver, 1997 bronze).

Skating career 
Lavanchy began skating in Morzine. He entered ice dancing immediately and partnered with an older skater, Isabelle Marcellin. After their split, he teamed up with Sophie Moniotte.

Moniotte/Lavanchy began competing internationally in the 1980s. In 1992, they competed at their first Winter Olympics, finishing ninth at the event in Albertville, France.

In the 1993–94 season, Moniotte/Lavanchy stood atop the podium at the 1993 Skate America and 1993 Skate Canada International. They placed fifth at the 1994 European Championships in Copenhagen, Denmark and at the 1994 Winter Olympics in Lillehammer, Norway. They were awarded silver at the final event of the season, the 1994 World Championships in Chiba, Japan.

In 1994–95, Moniotte/Lavanchy won the 1994 NHK Trophy and their third consecutive national title. The duo then won silver at the 1995 European Championships in Dortmund, Germany and bronze at the 1995 World Championships in Birmingham, England.

In the 1995–96 season, Moniotte/Lavanchy were invited to compete at two events of the inaugural Champions Series (Grand Prix), the 1995 Skate America and 1995 Nations Cup. They withdrew due to injury. On 19 October 1995, Moniotte fractured the lateral malleolus of her left ankle while training at the Colombes rink. Although she resumed training in January 1996, she had not recovered and the duo ultimately decided to withdraw from the 1996 World Championships.

Moniotte/Lavanchy returned to competition in the 1996–97 season. In October 1996, they finished second to Marina Anissina / Gwendal Peizerat at the French Championships, having placed first in the compulsory and original dances and second in the free dance. Despite the loss of their national title, they edged out Anissina/Peizerat for the bronze medal at the 1997 European Championships in Paris, France. Moniotte/Lavanchy then placed fourth at the 1997 World Championships in Lausanne, Switzerland, again finishing as the top French team.

In the 1997–98 season, Moniotte/Lavanchy once again lost to Anissina/Peizerat at the French Championships and then slipped behind internationally, placing seventh at the 1998 European Championships in Milan, Italy. Moniotte/Lavanchy became three-time Olympians at the 1998 Winter Olympics in Nagano, Japan. They placed 11th and then retired from competition.

Later life 
Following the end of his skating career, Lavanchy became a stunt driver.

Programs 
(with Moniotte)

Results
CS: Champions Series (Grand Prix)

with Moniotte

References

French male ice dancers
Olympic figure skaters of France
Figure skaters at the 1992 Winter Olympics
Figure skaters at the 1994 Winter Olympics
Figure skaters at the 1998 Winter Olympics
Living people
1968 births
World Figure Skating Championships medalists
European Figure Skating Championships medalists
People from Thonon-les-Bains
Sportspeople from Haute-Savoie